The 2016 Kenyan Premier League (known as the SportPesa Premier League for sponsorship reasons) was the 13th season of the Kenyan Premier League since it began in 2003, and the 53rd season of top-division football in Kenya since 1963. It began on 13 February and ended on 19 November. Tusker won their eleventh league title, earning a place in the preliminary round of the 2017 CAF Champions League. Ulinzi Stars earned a place in the preliminary round of the 2017 CAF Confederation Cup as runners-up of the 2016 FKF President's Cup, which was also won by Tusker. The two teams will face each other at the 2017 Kenyan Super Cup.

A total of 16 teams competed for the Kenyan Premier League, of which 14 returned from the 2015 season. Posta Rangers and Kakamega Homeboyz were promoted from the second-tier FKF Premier League after spending three and two seasons away from the top flight, respectively.

Changes from last season

Relegated from Premier League
 Kenya Commercial Bank
 Nakuru AllStars

Promoted from FKF Premier League
 Kakamega Homeboyz
 Posta Rangers

Teams
Seven of the participating teams are based in the capital, Nairobi, while Bandari is the only team based at the Coast.

Stadia and locations

League table

Positions by round
The table lists the positions of teams after each week of matches. In order to preserve chronological evolvements, any postponed matches are not included to the round at which they were originally scheduled, but added to the full round they were played immediately afterwards. For example, if a match is scheduled for matchday 13, but then postponed and played between days 16 and 17, it will be added to the standings for day 16.

Results

Top scorers

*

Hat-tricks

References

Kenya
Kenya
1
2016